Tapuiasaurus (meaning "Tapuia lizard") is a genus of titanosaur which lived during the Lower Cretaceous period (Aptian age) in what is now Minas Gerais, Brazil. Its fossils, including a partial skeleton with a nearly complete skull, have been recovered from the Quiricó Formation of the São Francisco Basin in Minas Gerais, eastern Brazil. This genus was named by Hussam Zaher, Diego Pol, Alberto B. Carvalho, Paulo M. Nascimento, Claudio Riccomini, Peter Larson, Rubén Juárez Valieri, Ricardo Pires Domingues, Nelson Jorge da Silva Jr. and Diógenes de Almeida Campos in 2011, and the type species is Tapuiasaurus macedoi.

Classification 
Tapuiasaurus was originally assigned to Nemegtosauridae by its original describers, but two subsequent cladistic analyses have recovered it as only distantly related to Nemegtosaurus, with Wilson et al. (2016) recovering the genus outside the Lithostrotia, and Carballido et al. (2017) recovering it as closely related to the Gondwanan lithostrotians Isisaurus and Rapetosaurus.

References 

Lithostrotians
Aptian life
Early Cretaceous dinosaurs of South America
Cretaceous Brazil
Fossils of Brazil
Fossil taxa described in 2011